Panathinaikos Football Club B, known as Panathinaikos B, (Greek: ΠΑΕ Παναθηναϊκός B) is a Greek football club based in Athens, Greece. Founded in 2021, they play as the reserve team of Panathinaikos in the Super League Greece 2.

Panathinaikos B is one of four reserve teams givens approval from the EPO (Hellenic Football Association) to play in the second division. Reserve teams must play a league below their main side, therefore, Panathinaikos B are ineligible for promotion to the Super League Greece. They cannot play in the Greek Cup either. Panathinaikos B helps young footballers get promoted to the team of Panathinaikos Athens.

Players

From Youth Academy

Personnel

Technical staff

Club staff

See also
:Category:Panathinaikos F.C. B players

References

 
Football
Football clubs in Athens
Association football clubs established in 2021
2021 establishments in Greece
Greek B teams
Super League Greece 2 clubs